AICO may refer to:

 A.I.C.O. -Incarnation-, a Japanese science fiction original net animation (ONA) anime series
 American Innovation and Choice Online Act, proposed antitrust legislation in the United States Congress
 ASEAN Industrial Cooperation Scheme, an industrial initiative established by the Association of Southeast Asian Nations; see Automotive industry in Thailand
 Indigenous Authorities of Colombia (Spanish: Autoridades Indígenas de Colombia, or AICO), a Colombian political party of indigenous people
 Eido II (also noted as "Aico"), bishop of Meissen from 1040 to 1045 or 1046